Vladimir Cheboksarov (born 30 December 1951) is a Russian former wrestler who competed in the 1976 Summer Olympics.

References

1951 births
Living people
Olympic wrestlers of the Soviet Union
Wrestlers at the 1976 Summer Olympics
Russian male sport wrestlers
Olympic silver medalists for the Soviet Union
Olympic medalists in wrestling
Soviet male sport wrestlers
Medalists at the 1976 Summer Olympics
Tyumen State University alumni